Churcher's College is an independent, fee-charging day school for girls and boys, founded in 1722. The Senior School (ages 11–18) is in the market town of Petersfield, Hampshire with the Junior School and Nursery (ages 2 years, 9 months–11) in nearby Liphook. It is a member of the Headmasters' and Headmistresses' Conference (HMC).

The College was founded in Petersfield in the 1720s by the will of Richard Churcher to educate local boys in the skills needed for service in the East India Company.

The headmaster is Simon Williams who replaced Geoffrey Buttle in September 2004.  Alumni are known as Old Churcherians or OCs.

History
The school was founded under the will of Richard Churcher in 1722. Churcher was a wealthy local philanthropist who had made his fortune through interests in the British East India Company. His will, dated 1722, decreed that the College was to educate:  Under the terms of the will, Churcher's College was created as a non-denominational foundation, a status it has kept to this day. The original school, built in 1729, is in College Street. The school became increasingly popular due to its successes, and in 1881 moved to its present location in Ramshill, accommodating 150 boys, on land donated by the J&W Nicholson & Co family of gin makers.

From 1946 to 1964 Broadlands, opposite the college grounds in Ramshill, was the preparatory school for Churcher's. It was Grade II listed in 1949.

For much of the 20th century Churcher's College operated as a voluntary aided grammar school. In 1979, Hampshire County Council decided to cease to maintain the college, which became an independent fee-paying school. The school's expanding population (by the mid-20th century the school educated some 400 boys, of whom about a quarter boarded in three separate houses: Mount House, Ramshill House and School house) has necessitated the addition of a number of modern buildings alongside the original 1881 buildings.

Girls were first admitted to the Sixth Form in 1980, and the school became fully co-educational in 1988. Reflecting its naval history, the college's houses are named after the naval heroes Drake, Grenville, Nelson and Rodney, with the later addition of Collingwood.

In 1993 the school purchased Moreton House School in Petersfield, which became Churcher's College Junior School. Like the senior school before it, the junior school is very successful, and soon outgrew its premises. Following an unsuccessful attempt to relocate in Petersfield, the school eventually purchased an existing school campus in Liphook (Littlefield's School), which from 2003 became the junior school's new site.

Sport and outdoor pursuits

The boys compete in rugby union, field hockey and cricket, whilst the girls play netball, field hockey and rounders. The College was the first school to affiliate to the Hampshire RFU in 1924. OC Frank Guy was responsible for the founding of local rugby union club Petersfield R.F.C. in 1927. In 2015, Churcher's won the NatWest Schools Cup under-18 Vase with 13-5 victory over SEEVIC College, the first Hampshire school to do so.

The school has equestrianism, golf, tennis, squash, swimming and athletics teams and events and competes in contests such as the Ten Tors, which they won in both 2014 and 2015, the Devizes to Westminster International Canoe Marathon, and the Charlton Chase and Butser Hill Challenge events.

There are Combined Cadet Force and Duke of Edinburgh Award programmes, as well as regular World Challenge and First Challenge expeditions.

Notable alumni

 Michael Auger (born 1990), member of the band Collabro which took the top prize in the TV show Britain’s Got Talent, 2014
 Brig Henry Baxter CBE GM, Commander of the Ulster Defence Regiment 1973–6; awarded the George Medal 1957 for removing an IRA bomb in Armagh
 Charles Beeson (1957–2021), TV director
 Dr Geoffrey Boxshall FRS, Natural History Museum 1974 to date
 Rhidian Brook, writer and broadcaster
 Arthur Brough, actor (Are You Being Served?)
 Rt Rev Harry Carpenter, Bishop of Oxford 1955–70
 Calum Chambers, footballer for Aston Villa F.C. and England
 Howard Drake OBE, High Commissioner to Jamaica from 2010 to 2013, and Ambassador to Chile from 2005 to 2009
  Sir Jeremy Farrar, Professor of Tropical Medicine, University of Oxford and Director of the Wellcome Trust
 Tim Footman, writer and quiz show regular
 Reg Gammon, artist
 Jim Hetherington, former England rugby union player
 Simon Ings, writer
 Edward Kelsey, actor (The Archers – Joe Grundy, DangerMouse)
 Alex Lawther, actor (The Imitation Game, The End of the F***ing World)
 Rear Adm Philip Mathias MBE, Director since 2010 of the Strategic Defence and Security Review (Nuclear), and President in 2004 of the Admiralty Interview Board
 John Peters (RAF officer), pilot shot down in first Gulf War on 17 January 1991
 Stuart Piggott (1910–1996), archaeologist
 Fiona Pocock, rugby union player for England
 Barrie Roberts (1939–2007), author, folk singer, freelance journalist and criminal lawyer
 Tim Rodber (born 1969), former England rugby union player
 Tiny Rowland (1917–1998), businessman and chairman of the Lonrho conglomerate 1962–1993
 Tim Spanton (born 1957), journalist
 Rear Adm Chris Snow, Flag Officer Sea Training since February 2009, and commanded HMS Ocean from 2005 to 2006
 Graham Stratford, cattle breeder and mayor of Alton
 Robert Tronson, TV and film director, including police dramas and The Darling Buds of May

References

Further reading
Atcheson, Nathaniel & Robert, The history of Churcher's College, Petersfield, Hants: with a sketch of the life of Mr. Richard Churcher, the founder. 1823. Google -Book Internet Archive J Butterworth & Son. New York Public Library.

Educational institutions established in 1722
Petersfield
Private schools in Hampshire
1722 establishments in England
 
Member schools of the Headmasters' and Headmistresses' Conference